Tianan Insurance (天安保险股份有限公司) is China's fifth largest nonlife insurer. The company was established in 1994. In 2005, Japan's Tokio Marine & Nichido Fire Insurance Co., Ltd. purchased a 24.9% stake in the company. In July 2020, the Chinese government announced that it would take over the company.

References

External links
Tianan Insurance

Financial services companies established in 1994
Insurance companies of China
Privately held companies of China
Chinese companies established in 1994
Tokio Marine